Old Mission Beach Athletic Club Rugby Football Club is a rugby union team based in San Diego, California. OMBAC RFC is directly affiliated with the Old Mission Beach Athletic Club.

History
The Old Mission Beach rugby club was established in 1966 under the wing of Old Mission Beach Athletic Club (OMBAC) which was founded in 1954. Many past students of the San Diego State University rugby team joined, and the OMBAC rugby club entered first division competition two years later in 1968. The club has won 6 national Rugby Sevens titles and 8 national Rugby Fifteens titles.

Venue
In 1991 OMBAC raised funds to build a new clubhouse joining only a handful of teams in the United States to have such a facility. Currently OMBAC plays its home matches at the "Little Q".  This site was previously the NFL San Diego Chargers practice facility.  It is now a nationally renowned rugby pitch that has hosted the USARFU National Championships, the USA Eagle NA4 developmental matches, and a host of other youth and collegiate matches.

Current 1st XV squad

Players in bold are internationally capped.

Notable former players
OMBAC players Mike Saunders, Brian Vizard, Kevin Higgins, Steve Gray, Chris Lippert and more recently, Dan Lyle, and Dave Hodges, have captained the United States national rugby union team in international competition.

OMBAC was represented in the 2007 Rugby World Cup by team members Todd Clever, Tui Osborne and Dan Payne. Former OMBAC player Will Hafu has played internationally for Tonga and also played professionally in England for Moseley RFC.

National Championships
OMBAC Rugby has distinguished itself with the following accomplishments:
2010 U.S.A. D3 National Champions
2006 Rugby Super League Champions
1996 U.S.A. National Champions
1994 U.S.A. National Champions
1993 U.S.A. National Champions
1991 U.S.A. National Champions
1989 U.S.A. National Champions
1988 U.S.A. National Champions

National 7s
2006 U.S.A. 7s National Champions
2002 U.S.A. 7s National Champions
2001 U.S.A. 7s National Champions
2000 U.S.A. 7s National Champions
1995 U.S.A. 7s National Champions
1985 U.S.A. 7s National Champions

National Placement
2014 Pacific Rugby Premiership Third place
2003 Super League Runners-Up
2002 Super League Semi-Finalists
2001 Super League Runners-Up
2000 Super League Semi-Finalists
2000 Third Place U.S.A. National Club Championships
1997 Third Place U.S.A. National Club Championships
1995 Runners-Up U.S.A. National Club Championships
1996 Runners-Up U.S.A. 7s National Club Championship

First XV Honors
This is a list of honors awarded to the OMBAC rugby union team.
 USA Rugby Division I Champions - 1988, 1989, 1991, 1993, 1994, 1996
Second place - 1995
Third place - 1997, 2000
USA Rugby National Club Sevens Champions - 1985, 1995, 2000, 2001, 2002, 2006
Second place - 1996, 2005, 2007
Third place - 1997
USA Rugby Division III Champions - 2010
Rugby Super League Championship
First place - 2006
Second place - 2001, 2003
Fourth place - 2000, 2002

Sponsorship
OMBAC Rugby's sponsors for the 2014 Pacific Rugby Premiership are the following:

Community sponsor - Turner construction company
Social sponsor - The beachcomber mission beach
Event sponsor - The Tilted Kilt mission valley
Kit sponsor - Canterbury

References

External links
 

Rugby union teams in San Diego
Rugby clubs established in 1966
1966 establishments in California